The Donga River is a river in Nigeria and Cameroon. The river arises from the Mambilla Plateau in Eastern Nigeria, forms part of the international border between Nigeria and Cameroon, and flows northwest to eventually merge with the Benue River in Nigeria.
At its peak, near the Benue the river delivers  of water per second.

In Taraba State, Nigeria, there are three forest reserves, Baissa, Amboi and Bissaula River, in the Donga river basin. They lie on the slopes and at the foot of the Mambilla Plateau, south-west of Gashaka Gumti National Park.

See also
Communes of Cameroon

References

Rivers of Nigeria
Rivers of Cameroon
International rivers of Africa
Cameroon–Nigeria border